The Sosto (2,220.6 m) is a mountain of the Swiss Lepontine Alps, overlooking Olivone in the canton of Ticino. It lies south of the lake of Luzzone and west of the Torrone di Nav.

References

External links
 Sosto on Hikr

Mountains of the Alps
Mountains of Ticino
Lepontine Alps
Mountains of Switzerland